Night Warning (French title: Nuits d'alerte) is a 1946 French war drama film directed by Léon Mathot and starring Hélène Perdrière, Roger Pigaut and Pierre Dudan. The film's sets were designed by the art director Roland Quignon.

Synopsis
A waitress helps an escaped French resistance fighter to evade capture and make it to Britain.

Cast
 Hélène Perdrière as Hélène  
 Roger Pigaut as Pierre  
 Pierre Dudan as Klaus  
 Philippe Hersent as Stefan Hess  
 Régine Montlaur as Lily  
 Marcelle Monthil 
 Henry Murray 
 Pierre Collet 
 Howard Vernon as L'aviateur anglais  
 Abel Tarride as L'aubergiste  
 Alexandre Mihalesco 
 Georges Jamin 
 Marc Cassot 
 Charles Lemontier as Le cheminot 
 Jane Marken as Madame Morizot  
 Marcel Delaître as Morizot  
 Simone Cerdan as La fille

References

Bibliography 
 Rège, Philippe. Encyclopedia of French Film Directors, Volume 1. Scarecrow Press, 2009.

External links 
 

1946 films
French war drama films
1940s war drama films
1940s French-language films
Films directed by Léon Mathot
French black-and-white films
1946 drama films
1940s French films